Cassady is a given name and surname. Notable people with the name include:

Cassady McClincy (born 2000), American actress
Carolyn Cassady (1923–2013), American writer
John Cassaday, American comic book writer-artist
Harry Cassady, American baseball player
Howard Cassady, American football player
John H. Cassady, American admiral
Neal Cassady, American writer
Thomas Cassady, American soldier and flying ace
James Cassady, Irish émigré from County Antrim to Queensland, Australia. Fleeing the Great Famine, he is remembered for leasing Mungalla Station in north Queensland, near Ingham, 1882, which he used to care for the indigenous locals. (It is now owned and operated by the local Aboriginal mob for vocational training and has been recognised for excellence.)

See also
Cassidy (given name)
Cassidy (surname)

References